Chand Saray, also spelled as Chand Sarai, is a village in Gosainganj block of Lucknow district, Uttar Pradesh, India. It forms the western endpoint of the under construction Purvanchal Expressway. As of 2011, the population of Chand Sarai is 2,222, in 421 households.

References 

Villages in Lucknow district
Caravanserais in India